"Una donna per amico" (Italian for "A Woman as a Friend") is a song composed by Lucio Battisti and Mogol, and performed by  Lucio Battisti. It was released as a single in October 1978, with "Nessun dolore" as B-side. The single peaked at first place fourteen consecutive weeks on the Italian hit parade between November 1978 and February 1979. It was the second most sold single of the year in Italy, behind Bee Gees' "Stayin' Alive".

At the 2006 Winter Olympics Opening Ceremony, "Una donna per amico" was played during the entrance of the Italian home team. Miss Italia, Edelfa Chiara Masciotta, carried the placard wearing a Moschino-designed dress. The Italian flag, called il Tricolore, was carried by 19-year-old figure skater Carolina Kostner.

"Una donna per amico" was covered by several artists, including Mina, Giorgia, Rosario Fiorello. It named a 1998 television series starring Elisabetta Gardini and a 2014 film directed by Giovanni Veronesi and starred by Fabio De Luigi and Laetitia Casta.

Track listing
7" single - ZBN 7110 
 "Una donna per amico'" (Lucio Battisti, Mogol) –  	4:21
 "Nessun dolore" (Lucio Battisti, Mogol) –   	4:23

References

1978 singles
Italian songs
Number-one singles in Italy
Songs written by Mogol (lyricist)
Lucio Battisti songs
1978 songs
Songs written by Lucio Battisti